Sweden competed at the 1972 Summer Olympics in Munich, West Germany. 131 competitors, 104 men and 27 women, took part in 90 events in 18 sports.

Medalists

Gold
 Ulrika Knape — Diving, Women's 10m Platform
 Ragnar Skanåker — Shooting, Men's Free Pistol
 Gunnar Larsson — Swimming, Men's 200m Individual Medley
 Gunnar Larsson — Swimming, Men's 400m Individual Medley

Silver
 Gunnar Jervill — Archery, Men's Individual Competition
 Ulrika Knape — Diving, Women's 3m Springboard
 Rolf Peterson — Canoeing, Men's K1 1000m
 Jan Karlsson — Wrestling, Men's Freestyle Welterweight
 Pelle Pettersson and Stellan Westerdahl — Sailing, Men's Star Class
 Bo Knape, Stefan Krook, Lennart Roslund and Stig Wennerström — Sailing, Men's Soling Class

Bronze
 Rickard Bruch — Athletics, Men's Discus Throw
 Hasse Thomsén — Boxing, Men's Heavyweight
 Jan Jönsson — Equestrian, Three-Day Event Individual competition
 Ulla Håkanson, Ninna Swaab and Maud von Rosen — Equestrian, Dressage Team Competition
 Hans Bettembourg — Weightlifting, Men's Middle Heavyweight
 Jan Karlsson — Wrestling, Men's Greco-Roman Welterweight

Archery

In the first modern archery competition at the Olympics, Sweden entered three men and two women.  Gunnar Jervill won a silver medal in the men's competition.

Men's Individual Competition:
 Gunnar Jervill – 2481 points (→  Silver Medal)
 Rolf Svensson – 2386 points (→ 16th place)
 Olov Bostroem – 2347 points (→ 27th place)

Women's Individual Competition:
 Maj-Britt Johansson – 2283 points (→ 19th place)
 Anna-Lisa Berglund – 2185 points (→ 34th place)

Athletics

Men's 1500 metres
Gunnar Ekman
 Heat — 3:40.4
 Semifinals — 3:39.4 (→ did not advance)

Ulf Hogberg
 Heat — 3:41.5
 Semifinals — 3:43.6 (→ did not advance)

Men's 5000 metres
Anders Gärderud
 Heat — 13:57.2 (→ did not advance)

Men's High Jump
Jan Dahlgren
 Qualifying Round — 2.15m
 Final — 2.15m (→ 11th place)

Boxing

Men's Heavyweight (+ 81 kg)
Hasse Thomsén →  Bronze Medal
 First Round — Defeated Jean Bassomben (CMR), 4:1
 Quarterfinals — Defeated Carroll Morgan (CAN), KO-3
 Semifinals — Lost to Ion Alexe (ROM), TKO-2

Canoeing

Cycling

Five cyclists represented Sweden in 1972.

Individual road race
 Lennart Fagerlund — 42nd place
 Sven-Åke Nilsson — 44th place
 Leif Hansson — did not finish (→ no ranking)
 Bernt Johansson — did not finish (→ no ranking)

Team time trial
 Lennart Fagerlund
 Tord Filipsson
 Leif Hansson
 Sven-Åke Nilsson

Diving

Women's 3m Springboard
 Ulrika Knape — 434.19 points (→  Silver Medal)
 Agneta Henriksson — 417.48 points (→ 6th place)

Women's 10m Platform
 Ulrika Knape — 390.00 points (→  Gold Medal)

Equestrian

Fencing

Six fencers, five men and one woman, represented Sweden in 1972.

Men's foil
 Per Sundberg

Men's épée
 Rolf Edling
 Orvar Jönsson
 Carl von Essen

Men's team épée
 Hans Wieselgren, Carl von Essen, Orvar Jönsson, Rolf Edling, Per Sundberg

Women's foil
 Kerstin Palm

Gymnastics

Handball

Summary

Men's Team Competition
In a very tight division for the first round, Sweden came out in first place after a tie-breaker with the Soviet Union.  Both teams had tied twice (Sweden had tied Poland and the Soviet Union) and won once.  Sweden's victory was over Denmark.  Both teams advanced to the second round with a 0-0-1 record to start, already behind East Germany which had defeated Czechoslovakia to enter with a 1-0-0 record.  Sweden lost its games to those two opponents while the Soviet Union split its pair, dropping the Swedes to fourth place in the division.  They played against Hungary for seventh and eighth places, winning 19-18.

Preliminary Round (Group A)
 Sweden – Poland 13-13 (5-7)
 Sweden – Soviet Union 11-11 (4-3)
 Sweden – Denmark 16-10 (8-4)
Second Round (Group A)
 Sweden – Czechoslovakia 12-15 (6-7)
 Sweden – East Germany 11-14 (6-8)
Classification Match
 Sweden – Hungary 19-18 (11-8) → 7th place

Team Roster
 Björn Andersson
 Bo Andersson
 Dan Eriksson
 Lennart Eriksson
 Johan Fischerström
 Göran Hård af Segerstad
 Bengt Johansson
 Benny Johansson
 Jan Jönsson
 Lars Karlsson
 Michael Koch
 Olle Olsson
 Sten Olsson
 Thomas Persson
 Bertil Söderberg
 Frank Ström

Judo

Modern pentathlon

Three male pentathletes represented Sweden in 1972.

Men's Individual Competition:
 Björn Ferm – 5283 points (→ 6th place)
 Bo Jansson – 4739 points (→ 24th place)
 Hans-Gunnar Liljenwall – 4704 points (→ 25th place)

Men's Team Competition:
 Ferm, Jansson, and Liljenwall – 14708 points (→ 5th place)

Rowing

Men's Single Sculls
Lennart Baiter
Heat — 8:12.92
Repechage — 8:11.07 (→ did not advance)

Sailing

Shooting

Ten male shooters represented Sweden in 1972. Ragnar Skanåker won gold in the 50 m pistol event.

25 m pistol
 Curt Andersson

50 m pistol
 Ragnar Skanåker
 Kjell Jacobsson

300 m rifle, three positions
 Sven Johansson

50 m rifle, three positions
 Christer Jansson
 Sven Johansson

50 m rifle, prone
 Christer Jansson
 Sven Johansson

50 m running target
 Göte Gåård
 Karl-Axel Karlsson

Trap
 Johnny Påhlsson

Skeet
 Lars-Erik Söderberg
 Gert-Åke Bengtsson

Swimming

Men's 100m Freestyle
Anders Bellbring
 Heat — DNS (→  did not advance)

Men's 200m Freestyle
Bernt Zarnowiecki
 Heat — 2:01.34 (→  did not advance)

Rolf Pettersson
 Heat — 2:00.02 (→  did not advance)

Hans Ljungberg
 Heat — 1:59.42 (→  did not advance)

Men's 4 × 200 m Freestyle Relay
 Hans Ljungberg, Bengt Gingsjö, Anders Bellbring, and Gunnar Larsson
 Heat — 7:57.54
Bengt Gingsjö, Hans Ljungberg, Anders Bellbring, and Gunnar Larsson
 Final — 7:47.37 (→ 4th place)

Weightlifting

Wrestling

References

Nations at the 1972 Summer Olympics
1972
Summer Olympics